Kankipadu mandal is one of the 25 mandals in the Krishna district of the Indian state of Andhra Pradesh.

Settlements
The following are the settlements and populations as at 2011.

Towns

Villages

References

Mandals in Krishna district